The Berwick Carbuilders were an American basketball team based in Berwick, Pennsylvania that was a member of the Eastern Professional Basketball League.

The Carbuilders were originally formed by Paul Stenn, a tackle from the National Football League's Chicago Bears.  The team was stockpiled with graduates from Villanova University, and played their home games at Stenko Arena (Stenn's last name was originally Stenko).

The Carbuilders' best season was in the 1952-1953 season, when they upset the Sunbury Mercuries in a best-of-three series, including winning the final game after three overtimes, to reach the 1953 President's Cup Finals.

Year-by-year

Continental Basketball Association teams
Basketball teams in Pennsylvania
Defunct basketball teams in the United States
Basketball teams established in 1949
Basketball teams disestablished in 1954
1949 establishments in Pennsylvania
1954 disestablishments in Pennsylvania
Columbia County, Pennsylvania